Coremacera marginata is a species of fly in the family Sciomyzidae, the marsh flies or snail-killing flies.

Subspecies
Subspecies include:
Coremacera marginata var. marginata  (Fabricius, 1775) 
Coremacera marginata  var. pontica Elberg, 1968

Distribution and habitat
This species occurs in most of Europe and in the Near East. These flies can be encountered in grasslands and woodlands,

Description
These flies have a slender, dark greyish body. The prominent eyes are reddish. The brown-yellowish antennae are forward-pointing, with a hairy 3rd segment and a whitish arista. The dark grey wings are mottled with greyish spots.

Biology
Adults feed on nectar or sipping dew. Larvae prey on several terrestrial genera of snails.

Gallery

References

External links
 Micropics.org.uk

Sciomyzidae
Insects described in 1775
Taxa named by Johan Christian Fabricius
Articles containing video clips
Muscomorph flies of Europe